The German city of Cologne was bombed in 262 separate air raids by the Allies during World War II, all by the Royal Air Force (RAF).  A total of 34,711 long tons of bombs were dropped on the city by the RAF. 20,000 people died during the war in Cologne due to aerial bombardments.

While air raid alarms had gone off in the winter/spring of 1940 as British bombers passed overhead, the first bombing took place on 12 May 1940. The 30/31 May 1942 attack on Cologne was the first 1,000 bomber raid.

First 1,000 bomber raid

The first ever 1,000 bomber raid by the RAF was conducted on Cologne on the night of 30/31 May 1942. Codenamed Operation Millennium, the massive raid was launched for two primary reasons:
 It was expected that the devastation from such raids might be enough to knock Germany out of the war or at least severely damage German morale.
 The raids were useful propaganda for the Allies and particularly for RAF Bomber Command head Arthur Harris's concept of a Strategic Bombing Offensive. Bomber Command's poor performance in bombing accuracy during 1941 had led to calls for the force to be split up and diverted to other urgent theatres e.g. the Battle of the Atlantic. A headline-grabbing heavy raid on Germany was a way for Harris to demonstrate to the War Cabinet that given the investment in numbers and technology Bomber Command could make a vital contribution to victory.

At this stage of the war Bomber Command only had a regular front line strength of around 400 aircraft, and were in the process of transitioning from the twin engined medium bombers of the pre-war years to the newer more effective four-engined heavy bombers such as the Handley Page Halifax and Avro Lancaster. By using bombers and men from Operational Training Units (OTUs), 250 from RAF Coastal Command and from Flying Training Command, Harris could easily make up the 1,000 aircraft. However, just before the raid took place, the Royal Navy refused to allow the Coastal Command aircraft to take part in the raid. The Admiralty perceived the propaganda justifications too weak an argument against the real and pressing threat of the U-boats in the Battle of the Atlantic. Harris scrambled around and, by crewing 49 more aircraft with pupil pilots and instructors, 1,047 bombers eventually took part in the raid, two and a half times more than any previous raid by the RAF. 58 bombers were from Polish units. In addition to the bombers attacking Cologne, 113 other aircraft on "intruder" raids harassed German night-fighter airfields.

Cologne was not Harris's first choice; he wanted to bomb Hamburg. Poor weather made Hamburg a poor choice; in addition, Harris was advised by Dr. Basil Dickins, a scientist who was section head of RAF's Bomber Command's Operations research, to choose Cologne, which was within GEE range.

This was the first time that the "bomber stream" tactic was used and most of the tactics used in this raid remained the basis for standard Bomber Command operations for the next two years and some elements remained in use until the end of the war. It was expected that such a large number of bombers flying in a bomber stream through the Kammhuber line would overwhelm the German night fighters' ground-controlled interception system, keeping the number of bombers shot down to an acceptable proportion. The recent introduction of GEE allowed the bombers to fly a given route at a given time and height. The British night bombing campaign had been in operation for some months, and a statistical estimate could be made of the number of bombers likely to be lost to enemy night fighters and flak, and how many would be lost through collisions. Minimising the former demanded a densely packed stream, as the controllers of a night fighter flying a defensive 'box' could only direct a maximum of six potential interceptions per hour, and the flak gunners could not concentrate on all the available targets at once. Earlier in the war four hours had been considered acceptable for a mission; for this raid all the bombers passed over Cologne and bombed in a window of 90 minutes, with the first having arrived at 00:47 of 31 May. It was anticipated that the concentration of bombing over such a short period would overwhelm the Cologne fire brigades and cause conflagrations similar to those inflicted on London by the Luftwaffe during the Blitz.

In the raid, 868 aircraft bombed the main target with 15 aircraft bombing other targets. The total tonnage of bombs dropped was 1,455 tons with two-thirds of that being incendiaries. Two and a half thousand separate fires were started with 1,700 classed by the German fire brigades as "large". The action of fire fighters and the width of the streets stopped the fires combining into a firestorm, but nonetheless most of the damage was done by fire and not directly by the explosive blasts. 3,330 non-residential buildings were destroyed, 2,090 seriously damaged and 7,420 lightly damaged, making a total of 12,840 buildings of which 2,560 were industrial or commercial buildings. Among the buildings classed as totally destroyed were: 7 official administration buildings, 14 public buildings, 7 banks, 9 hospitals, 17 churches, 16 schools, 4 university buildings, 10 postal and railway buildings, 10 buildings of historic interest, 2 newspaper offices, 4 hotels, 2 cinemas and 6 department stores. The only military installation damaged was the flak barracks. The damage to civilian homes, most of them apartments in larger buildings, was considerable: 13,010 destroyed, 6,360 seriously damaged, 22,270 lightly damaged. The devastation was recorded by Hermann Claasen from 1942 until the end of the war, and presented in his exhibition and book of 1947 Singing in the furnace. Cologne – Remains of an old city.

The RAF lost 43 aircraft (German sources claimed 44), 3.9% of the 1,103 bombers sent on the raid; 22 aircraft were lost over or near Cologne, 16 shot down by flak, four by night fighters, two in a collision, and two Bristol Blenheim light bombers lost in attacks on night fighter airfields. A posthumous Victoria Cross was awarded to Flying Officer Leslie Thomas Manser who sacrificed himself so his crew could abandon the aircraft.

Timeline

See also
 The Blitz – German air raids on British cities in which at least 40,000 died, including 57 consecutive nights of air raids just over London
 Baedeker Blitz – Air raids on English cities of cultural/historical importance, rather than military significance
 German bombing of Rotterdam
 Bombing of Dresden in World War II
 Bombing of Guernica – German/Italian air raid that sparked international outrage
 Bombing of Tokyo (10 March 1945), the codenamed-Operation Meetinghouse firebombing raid on Tokyo on 9/10 March 1945

Notes
Notes

Citations

References

External links
 Pictures of bomb-damaged Cologne

History of Cologne
Aerial operations and battles of World War II involving Germany
Aerial operations and battles of World War II involving the United Kingdom
Aerial operations and battles of World War II involving the United States
Cologne
World War II strategic bombing of Germany
Firebombings
Germany–United Kingdom military relations